Clepitoides is a genus of beetles in the family Cerambycidae, first described by Robin O. S. Clarke in 2009.

Species 
Clepitoides contains the following species:
 Clepitoides anae Clarke, 2009
 Clepitoides crocata (Bates, 1873)
 Clepitoides gerardi Clarke, 2009
 Clepitoides neei Clarke, 2009
 Clepitoides pallidicornis (Zajciw, 1966)
 Clepitoides picturata (Gounelle, 1911)
 Clepitoides thomasi Santos-Silva, Martins & Clarke, 2013
 Clepitoides virgata (Gounelle, 1911)

References

Rhinotragini